In the history of the courts of England and Wales, the Court of Probate was created by the Court of Probate Act 1857, which transferred the jurisdiction of the ecclesiastical courts in testamentary matters to the new court so created.

The Judge of the Court of Probate also presided over the Court for Divorce and Matrimonial Causes, but the two courts remained separate entities.

On 1 November 1875, under the Supreme Court of Judicature Act 1873 and the Supreme Court of Judicature Act 1875, the Judge of the Court of Probate was transferred, as its President, to the Probate, Divorce and Admiralty Division of the High Court of Justice.

Judges of the Court of Probate

 6 January 1858: Sir Cresswell Cresswell
 26 August 1863: Sir James Plaisted Wilde (from 6 April 1869, Lord Penzance)
 14 November 1872: Sir James Hannen

References
 
 
 
 
 Swabey and Tristram's Reports
 
 
 
 
 

Courts and tribunals established in 1857
1875 disestablishments in England
Former courts and tribunals in England and Wales
1857 establishments in the United Kingdom
Probate courts
Courts and tribunals disestablished in 1875